The Bij 't Vuur was a Dutch automobile manufactured by C. Bij 't Vuur in Arnhem from 1902 until 1906. The name means something like "Near to the fire".

The company started out as a coachbuilder, when in 1901 it made her first car. The first cars had Aster engines but later ones used De Dion-Bouton or Panhard units. With the car Bij 't Vuur took part in the Toer door Nederland (Tour of Holland, one of the first initiatives in the Netherlands to promote cars), after which it was sold.

The next project was a car with a bit heavier engine. In 1902 a 9 hp and a 12 hp-version were offered, which had a quite modern cardan axle with three gears forward and one backwards.

At the RAI Motor Show of 1905 Bij 't Vuur showed a car with a self-built engine. This marked the end of Bij 't Vuur as car manufacturer. From then on, it only made buses.

About 25 cars were produced.

References
David Burgess Wise, The New Illustrated Encyclopedia of Automobiles.

Car manufacturers of the Netherlands
Bus manufacturers of the Netherlands
Dutch companies established in 1902
Vehicle manufacturing companies established in 1902